The Roman Catholic Diocese of Jinja is a diocese located in the city of Jinja in the Ecclesiastical province of Tororo in Uganda.

History
 June 10, 1948: Established as Apostolic Vicariate of Kampala from the Apostolic Vicariate of Upper Nile
 March 25, 1953: Promoted as Diocese of Kampala 
 August 5, 1966: Renamed as Diocese of Jinja

Leadership
 Vicar Apostolic of Kampala (Roman rite) 
 Bishop Vincent Billington, M.H.M. (1948.05.13 – 1953.03.25 see below)
 Bishop of Kampala (Roman rite) 
 Bishop Vincent Billington, M.H.M. (see below 1953.03.25 – 1965.05.03)
 Bishops of Jinja (Roman rite)
 Bishop Joseph B. Willigers, M.H.M. (1967.07.13- 2010.03.02)
 Bishop Charles Martin Wamika (since March 2010)

See also
 Roman Catholicism in Uganda
 Jinja

References

External links
 GCatholic.org
 Catholic Hierarchy

Roman Catholic dioceses in Uganda
Christian organizations established in 1948
Jinja District
Roman Catholic dioceses and prelatures established in the 20th century
1948 establishments in Uganda
Jinja, Uganda
Roman Catholic Ecclesiastical Province of Tororo